Neerthirai is a 2019 Indian Tamil-language comedy film directed by P. S. Dharan and produced by Kameela Nassar. It stars an ensemble cast including Nassar, Thalaivasal Vijay, Viji Chandrasekhar and Rohini in the lead roles. The film began production in late 2018 and had a limited release on 22 March 2019. The film was unsuccessful at the box office.

Plot
A set of college friends unite after three decades for a reunion. Their meeting begins on a cheerful note, but later becomes a serious introspection on their past and present.

Cast
Nassar as Basheer
Thalaivasal Vijay as Kannan
Viji Chandrasekhar as Abhirami
Babloo Prithiveeraj as Yoganand
Bala Singh
Rohini as Banu
Ashwin Kakumanu

Production
The film was shot in late 2018, and was intended to be an experimental, conversation-driven project. P. S. Dharan, a cinematographer who had often worked with Nassar directed the film. Although Kameela Nassar initially produced the film under the Abi Entertainments banner, she later released the film through the newly launched N Medias studio.

Release
The film had a limited release across Tamil Nadu on 22 March 2019 by distributors SPI Cinemas and AP Film International. The film was shown in a single show on a single day, as the makers sought to give the film a release on a digital platform at a later date. It was also noted for becoming the first Tamil film to discuss the Me Too movement. A critic from Times of India wrote "The conversations seem engaging enough and the actors are all appealing, but somehow, you do not get the feel of watching a cinema. The experience is more akin to watching a theatrical play." A critic from The Hindu compared the film's arty approach to Amshan Kumar's Manusangada (2017) and Chezhiyan's To Let (2019). The reviewer compared the film's plot to the Malayalam film Ozhivudivasathe Kali (2015) and the romantic drama '96 (2018), citing that all three stories featured tales of reunions. A further reviewer noted "although the film is a different attempt, if the screenplay had been a little faster, then it would have given a better film watching experience."

References

External links

2019 films
2010s Tamil-language films
Indian comedy films
2019 comedy films